Joseph Gattegno (1939-2016)  (was an Israeli painter)

Born in Bulgaria, Joseph immigrated with his family to Israel in 1940 as a baby.

After his art studies, he was among the leaders of Israeli art group named 10+, which included Raffi Lavie and Moshe Givati. In 1963 he was sent by the Ministry of Culture and Education to represent Israel at the Biennale de Paris, France. In 1965 he won an acquisition award on behalf of the Tel Aviv Museum and was sent to Biennale de Paris again. In 1966 Gattegno won the Sharet scholarship for overseas studies from the America Israel Cultural Foundation and moved to Paris, with his wife.
During his studies in Paris, he graduated from the Ecole Nationale Superieure des Beaux-Arts and École nationale supérieure des arts appliqués et des métiers d'art.

International exhibitions 

 Group Exhibition in Ostend, Belgium
 Group Exhibition, Centre Berger, Paris
 Group Exhibition in Cherbourg, France
 Solo exhibition at "Gallery Yves Brun", Paris
 Solo exhibition at De Sfinx, Amsterdam
 Solo exhibition sponsored by the organization Baron de Rothschild, France.
 Solo exhibition at Torrier Ardeche, France

Exhibitions in Israel 

 Solo exhibition Painters and Sculptors Association booth, Tel Aviv
 Exhibition "Day mode", "Bezalel" museum, Jerusalem
 Solo exhibition at Dugit museum
 Solo exhibition at "Liioik art house", Tel Aviv
 Solo exhibition at the Holon Municipal museum
 Solo exhibition at "Shlush Gallery", Tel Aviv
 Solo exhibition at "Efrat Gallery", Tel Aviv

External links 
 
  Joseph Gattegno gallery website

1939 births
2016 deaths
Bulgarian emigrants to Israel
Israeli people of Bulgarian-Jewish descent
Israeli Jews
Bulgarian Jews in Israel
Israeli painters
Burials at Yarkon Cemetery